Kota  is a census town in Sonbhadra district in the Indian state of Uttar Pradesh.

Demographics
As of the 2001 Census of India, Kota had a population of 13,544. Males constitute 53% of the population and females 47%. Kota has an average literacy rate of 82%, higher than the national average of 59.5%: male literacy is 88%, and female literacy is 75%. In Kota, 11% of the population is under 6 years of age.

References

Cities and towns in Sonbhadra district